Brûlon is a commune in the Sarthe department in the region of Pays de la Loire in north-western France.

Geography
The river Vègre forms all of the commune's south-eastern border.

See also
Communes of the Sarthe department

References

Communes of Sarthe
Maine (province)